Bruce Elliott Plummer (born September 1, 1964) is a former professional American football player who played defensive back in the National Football League. He played five seasons for the Denver Broncos (1987–1988, 1990), the Miami Dolphins (1988), the Indianapolis Colts (1989), the San Francisco 49ers (1990), and the Philadelphia Eagles (1991).

1964 births
Living people
People from Bogalusa, Louisiana
Players of American football from Louisiana
American football cornerbacks
Mississippi State Bulldogs football players
Denver Broncos players
Miami Dolphins players
Indianapolis Colts players
San Francisco 49ers players
Philadelphia Eagles players
Albany Firebirds players
Milwaukee Mustangs (1994–2001) players
Memphis Pharaohs players
Arizona Rattlers players